Hold On was the fifth album by High Inergy. Like their previous three albums, this one was a commercial and critical disappointment.  It peaked at #70 on Billboard's R&B Album charts and failed to make the Top 200 Pop Album charts. The album spawned one chart single, a cover of Bettye Swann's #1 R&B hit, "Make Me Yours", which Andrew Hamilton in his All Music Guide review described as "better-than-the-original."  Unfortunately, High Inergy's version failed to achieve the chart success of the original, peaking at just #68.

Track listing 
The following is the track listing from the original vinyl LP.
Side One
"I Just Can't Help Myself" (Donnell Jones, Anthony Mason) - 4:29
"Sweet Man" (Marvin Augustus, Patricia Scott) - 4:32
"Make Me Yours" (Bettye J. Champion) - 3:30
"Hold On to My Love" (Bobby DeBarge, Bunny DeBarge) - 5:03 (High Inergy & Switch)

Side Two
"If I Love You Tonight" (Eddie Coleman, Jr., Gwen Gordy Fuqua, Gwendolyn Fuller) - 3:53
"Boomerang Love" (Angelo Bond, William Weatherspoon) - 3:30
"I'm a Believer" (Narada Michael Walden) - 3:50
"It Was You Babe" (McKinley Jackson, Angelo Bond, Barbara Mitchell) - 5:04

Production 
The following information comes from the original vinyl LP.

Producers: Angelo Bond, Eddie Coleman, Jr., Bobby DeBarge, Gwen Gordy Fuqua (co-producer), Gambler's Productions, McKinley Jackson, Narada Michael Walden and William Weatherspoon
Executive Producer: Berry Gordy

Session musicians (partial list) 
The following information comes from the original vinyl LP.

 Eddie "Bongo" Brown - percussion
 Ollie E. Brown - drums
 Paulinho DaCosta - percussion
 Bobby DeBarge - piano
 Tommy DeBarge - bass
 Quentin Dennard - drums
 Nathan East - bass
 Phillip Ingram - percussion
 Paul M. Jackson, Jr. - guitar
 Randy Jackson - bass
 Melvin "Wah Wah" Ragin - guitar
 Narada Michael Walden - drums

References 

1980 albums
Gordy Records albums
Albums produced by Narada Michael Walden
High Inergy albums